Raymond V. Murray (born June 14, 1910, date of death 1961) was an American speed skater who competed in the 1932 Winter Olympics.

He won the US intermediate speed skating championship in 1929. In 1930 he won the New York indoor senior crown. 

In 1932 he finished fifth in the 1500 metres event. He also participated in the 500 metres competition but was eliminated in the heats.

References

External links
 Olympics.com entry
 Speed skating 1932 

1910 births
Year of death missing
American male speed skaters
Olympic speed skaters of the United States
Speed skaters at the 1932 Winter Olympics